Armed groups attacked villagers in Chad in September 2005. Several dozen were killed, with estimates ranging from 36 to 75. Chad blamed Janjaweed forces in what was allegedly a cross border operation. This and subsequent  operations then led to a deterioration in relations between Chad and Sudan.

See also 
 Chadian Civil War (2005–2010)
 Chad–Sudan relations

References

2005 in Sudan
2005 in Chad
Chad–Sudan relations
Attacks in Africa in 2005